Geoffrey Andrew Smale (5 November 1924 – 9 April 2011) was a New Zealand yachtsman and a North Shore-based businessman.

Sailing
He represented New Zealand in yachting at the 1968 Summer Olympics in Mexico City, coming 8th in the Flying Dutchman class. In 1958, he put New Zealand on the sailing map by winning the Prince of Wales cup at Cowes, Isle of Wight.

Death
In 2011, he died aged 86, when the DynAero microlight plane he was flying from Auckland to Ashburton crashed into ranges near Nelson. He began flying about three years prior to the accident.

References

1924 births
2011 deaths
Olympic sailors of New Zealand
Sailors at the 1968 Summer Olympics – Flying Dutchman
New Zealand businesspeople
New Zealand male sailors (sport)
Aviators killed in aviation accidents or incidents in New Zealand
Victims of aviation accidents or incidents in 2011